Keravan jäähalli (Kerava ice rink) is an indoor arena in Kerava, Finland.  It is the home arena for HC Keski-Uusimaa of the Mestis.

References

Indoor arenas in Finland
Indoor ice hockey venues in Finland
Kerava
Buildings and structures in Uusimaa
Sports venues completed in 1987
1987 establishments in Finland